The 2019 UEFA Women's Futsal Championship, also referred to as UEFA Women's Futsal Euro 2019, was the first edition of the UEFA Women's Futsal Championship, the biennial international futsal championship organised by UEFA for the women's national teams of Europe.

Spain won the title to become the first UEFA Women's Futsal Euro champions.

Teams
A total of 23 (out of 55) UEFA member national teams entered the qualifying stage, with Northern Ireland taking part in their first international futsal tournament for men or women. They are seeded according to the coefficient ranking of their men's senior national teams, calculated based on the following:
UEFA Futsal Euro 2016 final tournament and qualifying competition
2016 FIFA Futsal World Cup final tournament and qualifying competition
UEFA Futsal Euro 2018 final tournament and qualifying competition

The 13 highest-ranked teams entered the main round, while the 10 lowest-ranked teams entered the preliminary round. The coefficient ranking was also used for seeding in the preliminary round and main round draws, where each team was assigned a seeding position according to their ranking for the respective draw. Three teams were pre-selected as hosts for the preliminary round and four teams were pre-selected as hosts for the main round.

The draws for the preliminary round and main round were held on 5 July 2018, 13:30 CEST (UTC+2), at the UEFA headquarters in Nyon, Switzerland. The mechanism of the draws for each round is as follows:
In the preliminary round, the 10 teams were drawn into three groups: one group of four containing one team from each of the seeding positions 1–4, and two groups of three containing one team from each of the seeding positions 1–3. First, the three teams which were pre-selected as hosts were drawn from their own designated pot and allocated to their respective group as per their seeding positions. Next, the remaining seven teams were drawn from their respective pot which were allocated according to their seeding positions (the lowest-ranked teams were allocated first to seeding position 4, then seeding position 3).
In the main round, the 16 teams were drawn into four groups of four, containing one team from each of the seeding positions 1–4. First, the four teams which were pre-selected as hosts were drawn from their own designated pot and allocated to their respective group as per their seeding positions. Next, the remaining 12 teams were drawn from their respective pot which were allocated according to their seeding positions (including the three preliminary round winners, whose identity was not known at the time of the draw, which were allocated to seeding position 4). Based on the decisions taken by the UEFA Emergency Panel, Russia and Ukraine would not be drawn into the same group.

Notes
Teams marked in bold have qualified for the final tournament.
(H):  Teams pre-selected as hosts for the preliminary round and the main round

Format
In the preliminary round and main round, each group is played as a round-robin mini-tournament at the pre-selected hosts.

In the final tournament, the four qualified teams play in knockout format (semi-finals, third place match, and final), either at a host selected by UEFA from one of the teams, or at a neutral venue if none of the teams wishes to host.

Tiebreakers
In the preliminary round and main round, teams are ranked according to points (3 points for a win, 1 point for a draw, 0 points for a loss), and if tied on points, the following tiebreaking criteria are applied, in the order given, to determine the rankings (Regulations Articles 14.01 and 14.02):
Points in head-to-head matches among tied teams;
Goal difference in head-to-head matches among tied teams;
Goals scored in head-to-head matches among tied teams;
If more than two teams are tied, and after applying all head-to-head criteria above, a subset of teams are still tied, all head-to-head criteria above are reapplied exclusively to this subset of teams;
Goal difference in all group matches;
Goals scored in all group matches;
Penalty shoot-out if only two teams have the same number of points, and they met in the last round of the group and are tied after applying all criteria above (not used if more than two teams have the same number of points, or if their rankings are not relevant for qualification for the next stage);
Disciplinary points (red card = 3 points, yellow card = 1 point, expulsion for two yellow cards in one match = 3 points);
UEFA coefficient;
Drawing of lots.

Schedule
The schedule of the competition is as follows.

In the preliminary round and main round, the schedule of each group is as follows, with one rest day between matchdays 2 and 3 for four-team groups, and no rest days for three-team groups (Regulations Articles 18.04, 18.05 and 18.06):

Note: For scheduling, the hosts are considered as Team 1, while the visiting teams are considered as Team 2, Team 3, and Team 4 according to their seeding positions.

Preliminary round
The winners of each group advance to the main round to join the 13 teams which receive byes.

Times are CEST (UTC+2), as listed by UEFA (local times, if different, are in parentheses).

Group A

Group B

Group C

Main round
The winners of each group advance to the final tournament.

Times are CEST (UTC+2), as listed by UEFA (local times, if different, are in parentheses).

Group 1

Group 2

Group 3

Group 4

Final tournament
The hosts of the final tournament were selected from the four qualified teams. Portugal's bid was selected over that of Spain by the UEFA Executive Committee on 27 September 2018, with the final tournament taking place at the Pavilhão Multiusos de Gondomar in Gondomar of the Porto Metropolitan Area, which previously hosted the 2007 UEFA Futsal Championship final tournament.

Qualified teams
The following teams qualified for the final tournament.

Final draw
The draw for the final tournament was held on 9 December 2018, 12:30 WET (UTC±0), at the Casa Branca de Gramido in Valbom, Portugal. The four teams were drawn into two semi-finals without any restrictions on Russia vs Ukraine

Squads
Each national team have to submit a squad of 14 players, two of whom must be goalkeepers.

Bracket
In the semi-finals and final, extra time and penalty shoot-out are used to decide the winner if necessary; however, no extra time is used in the third place match (Regulations Article 16.02 and 16.03).

Times are CET (UTC+1), as listed by UEFA (local times are in parentheses).

Semi-finals

Third place match

Final

Top goalscorers
Preliminary round: 
Main round: 
Final tournament:

Broadcasting 
For the final four round

Participating nations

Non-participating European nations and outside Europe

References

External links

UEFA Women's Futsal EURO 2019, UEFA.com

2019
2018–19 in European futsal
2019 in women's association football
August 2018 sports events in Europe
September 2018 sports events in Europe
February 2019 sports events in Europe
International futsal competitions hosted by Portugal
2018–19 in Portuguese football
Sport in Gondomar, Portugal